Petar Kostadinov (born 19 May 1954) is a Bulgarian water polo player. He competed in the men's tournament at the 1980 Summer Olympics.

References

1954 births
Living people
Bulgarian male water polo players
Olympic water polo players of Bulgaria
Water polo players at the 1980 Summer Olympics
Place of birth missing (living people)